Maurice John P. Daly (born August 1914, died 3 November 1994, Mount Eliza, Victoria, Australia) was an English player of rugby union football, who played internationally for both Ireland and East Africa. Along with W.B. Young of  he is one of only two people to have been capped by a major rugby playing nation and by East Africa.

Prior to World War II
At his senior school, Maurice was a keen rugby player, cricketer, track athlete and Rugby fives player. After leaving school he played for Old Haberdashers RFC (1932–37) and the Harlequin F.C. (1938–39), scoring tries prolifically in both the 15-a-side and 7-a-side versions of the game. England led 23–0 at half-time but Ireland improved during the second half managing to score four tries (the last of which was scored by Daly), though Ireland were unable to completely overcome the opposition, eventually losing 36–14.

During the war
He was commissioned in the 35th (First Surrey Rifles) Anti-Aircraft Battalion, T.A. in January 1939 and was called up in September of that year.  It is believed that Maurice played for Clifton RFC during the 1939–40 season; an Army posting may explain his presence in Bristol at this time.  He saw action in Italy, France, Belgium and Germany.  The war caused much disruption to regular rugby in the United Kingdom though he continued to play some rugby during this time, turning out for various military units and also for several invitation sides for various charitable causes.

After being wounded he became Air Liaison Officer, North West Europe in December 1944 with the rank of major and was awarded the M.B.E.

After the war
After the war he returned to play with Harlequins (1945–48); he captained the Harlequins VII that lost the final of the 1947–48 Middlesex 7's to Wasps 14–5. He was also selected to represent Middlesex County consistently between 1946 and 1949, captaining the side that lost the 1946/47 semi-final with Gloucestershire.

Sometime in 1949–50, he moved to Kenya where he continued to play rugby for the Ruiru R.F.C. and was awarded a cap by East Africa for a match that he played in 1951.  Though the Rugby Football Union of East Africa (RFUEA) did not exist until 1953, Maurice played for Kenya Colony (the precursor of the Kenya national rugby union team) against the "Oxford and Cambridge Universities" touring team in September 1951 at Mitchell Park (now Jamhuri Park), Nairobi.  All players on the Kenyan team in that match were awarded backdated East Africa caps after the formation of the RFUEA.  Oxford and Cambridge were returning by air from a successful tour of South Africa and they stopped off to play one final match on the continent.  The visitors fielded six international players (Ian J. Botting, John V. Smith(), Laurie G. Gloag, Lewis B. Cannell(), John MacG. Kendall-Carpenter and George C. Rittson-Thomas) and three players who were to achieve international status on their return (Chris E. Winn, Ricky M. Bartlett and Mike Walker) and proved too strong for their hosts, winning 44–5.

He met his wife in Kenya and they were married in 1952.  They left Kenya during the Mau Mau Uprising moving to Sussex, where they lived for 15 years until they finally emigrated to Australia.

References

Irish rugby union players
Ireland international rugby union players
1994 deaths
1914 births
Irish emigrants to Australia
Members of the Order of the British Empire
Harlequin F.C. players
British military personnel of World War II
British expatriates in Kenya